Ancestors of Enlil or Enki-Ninki deities were a group of Mesopotamian deities. Individual lists do not agree on their number, though the enumerations always start with the pair Enki (to be distinguished from the water god Enki) and Ninki and end with Enlil. They were regarded as primordial, ancestral beings who were no longer active and resided in the underworld. They could be invoked in exorcisms. They are attested in various texts, including god lists, incantations, prayers and myths.

Terminology
The term "ancestors of Enlil" refers to a group of Mesopotamian deities. They are already attested in Early Dynastic sources. The same group is sometimes instead referred to as "Enki-Ninki deities" (German: Enki-Ninki-Gottheiten), an approximate translation of the plural (d)En-ki-(e-)ne-(d)Nin/Nun-ki-(e-)ne, derived from the names of the pair Enki and Ninki, and used to refer to all of these deities collectively in primary sources. Wilfred G. Lambert proposed the English translation "Enkis and Ninkis". He also coined the term "theogony of Enlil" to refer to the lists of these divine ancestors. The latter label is also used by Andrew R. George.

The names Enki and Ninki refer to a pair typically opening lists of ancestors of Enlil. The names of the individual pairs which follow all contain the signs en, "lord", and nin, "lady". In each pair, the en name precedes the nin name. There is no indication that the individual pairs were meant to illustrate the stages of development of the universe. Not all of the names are possible to fully translate. The pairs occur in a different order in each of the available sources, and only the position of Enki and Ninki as the first generation and Enlil and Ninlil as the last is consistent, with no exceptions from the former rule and only one from the latter. The number of pairs varies from 3 to 21. 7 or 8 appear in Early Dynastic god lists, 9 (10 if Enmešarra is counted) in the Old Babylonian god list from Mari, 16 in the Old Babylonian An = Anum forerunner, and 21 in An = Anum (tablet I, lines 96–138). The unusual length of the sequence in the last of these sources was most likely the result of compiling variant traditions.

While Enki and Ninki could be identified in older scholarship as Enki and Damgalnuna, this view is regarded as erroneous. As already noted by Thorkild Jacobsen in 1976, the ancestral deity Enki is to be distinguished from the better known god of the same name, who is associated with fresh water. Wilfred G. Lambert has suggested that the latter name had a different etymology, and due to the presence of an omittible g in spellings such as dEn-ki-ga-ke4 assumed that instead of ki, "earth", it was formed with the element kig, of unknown meaning. Jacobsen instead explained the two names as having slightly different meanings from each other, "lord earth" and "lord of the earth". The equation of Enki and Ninki with Ea (Enki) and Damkina (Damgalnuna) in an Emesal vocabulary is isolated and presumably a mistake, and the Emesal forms of the names of the two Enkis, respectively Umunki and Amanki, are not identical.

Position in Mesopotamian mythology
According to Christopher Metcalf, the tradition regarding Enlil's parentage which involved the Enki-Ninki deities is now considered conventional, though relevant sources remain difficult to interpret. Based on the meaning of the names Enki and Ninki, it is presumed it was related to the belief that earth was a primordial element from which everything else emerged. However, Enlil's parentage presumably varied between traditions. He was alternatively regarded as a son of Anu, as attested for example in an inscription of  Lugalzagesi. Two sources which include both the pairs Enki and Ninki and An with either Urash or Ki, with the latter placed before them, are also known, and presumably reflect the belief that the coupling of earth and heaven preceded the emergence of the ancestors of Enlil. A further deity who could be regarded as Enlil's father was Lugaldukuga, a figure associated with the “holy mound” (duku).

While Ninlil can be mentioned alongside Enlil in the lists enumerating his ancestors, these deities are never described as the ancestors of both of them, possibly to avoid the implications of incest between them. Wilfred G. Lambert suggested that an alternate interpretation of the lists might have been that each "generation" evolved from the previous one, with Enki and Ninki slowly morphing into Enlil and Ninlil, similarly with no implications of incest.

The ancestors of Enlil were associated with the underworld. However, available sources do not explain how they came to reside there. Andrew R. George suggests that their placement in the underworld simply reflected the fact they were believed to be no longer active. A myth in which Enki and Ninki were banished to the underworld or fled there and found a new role there might have existed, though it is not directly preserved save for a possible allusion in an incantation. A single incantation places them in the Abzu, which is presumed to be a part of a broader pattern of references to underworld deities instead dwelling there.

The names of the primordial deities associated with Enlil could be invoked in exorcisms against evil spirits, though according to Wilfred G. Lambert relevant sources postdate the Old Babylonian period and might represent a tradition which only developed relatively late. However, according to Andrew R. George earlier examples also exist, and typically make Enki and Ninki the figures by which demons are forced to swear oaths in specific exorcisms. As primordial deities, they might have been invoked in this context as a representation of the state of the universe before the emergence of forces they were meant to counter.

Attestations
The oldest references to the ancestors of Enlil have been identified in the Fara and Abu Salabikh god lists from the Early Dynastic period. They have been dated to the middle of the third millennium BCE. They are also present in a short passage from an early literary text:

They are also mentioned in relation with the underworld in the zame hymn dedicated to Nergal. The residence of this god is described in it as "the big dwelling, whose shadow spreads in the west over the Enki and Ninki".

Ninki alone is mentioned in the oath formula on Eannatum's Stele of the Vultures, where it is stated that if Umma were to break the promises made, this goddess would punish the city. This formula differs from these assigned to all the other deities invoked in the same text (Enlil, Ninhursag, Enki, Suen and Utu).

In incantations dated to the middle of the third millennium BCE, Enki and Ninki are mentioned in association with roots of the tamarisk. Two examples, presumed to be copies of southern Mesopotamian texts, are known from Ebla:

Presumably the tree was believed to "mediate" between Enki and Ninki, who resided in the underworld, and An, who resided in heaven.

A single offering to a goddess named Ninki, made by the queen, is mentioned in another text from Ebla, but according to Alfonso Archi most likely this figure is to be distinguished from the primordial deity bearing the same name. He suggests this name might only be an uncommon spelling of the better attested dbe-munus/dBa-al6-tum, the spouse of Hadabal. In an earlier publication he also considered it a possibility that she might have been the spouse of the local form of Ea, Ḥayya. "Ninki" is also attested in Ebla as a part of the phrase nin-ki kalam timki, “lady of the country”, possibly the epithet of a goddess, and as a title of Tilut, one of the wives of the vizier Ibrium.

According to Wilfred G. Lambert, after the Early Dynastic period a gap in attestations of the ancestors of Enlil occurs, but further sources mentioning them are known from the Old Babylonian period and later. However, Gonzalo Rubio lists a single possible Ur III example, a fragment from Nippur, N-T545 (A 33647), which might be either an incantation or a literary text. It is also assumed that a mourning festival dedicated to them -associated with the duku in Nippur took place annually as early as in the third millennium BCE. Walther Sallaberger argues that ezem dukuga, celebrated there in the Ur III period, can be connected with later rites associated with them. In later periods they appear in various versions of Udug Hul. In Šurpu, the pairs Enki and Ninki and Enšar and Ninšar are invoked.

The ancestors of Enlil are also mentioned in the myth Death of Gilgamesh. The eponymous hero seemingly meets them in the underworld.

Enumerations of pairs of ancestors of Enlil also occur in laments dedicated to him, which commonly include long lists of various deities associated with him. An unfinished text of this variety known from the Old Babylonian tablet CBS 10417 mentions a gift he received from the pairs Enki and Ninki and Enul and Ninul. According to Paul Delnero's interpretation of the text, most likely a goddess appeals to Enlil to spare her city from destruction, similarly as Bau does in another similar text, in this case by reminding him of the time when he himself received a city from his ancestors. A prayer to Enlil refers to Enki and Ninki as “the father who begat you”. Jeremiah Peterson has tentatively suggested that a recently published fragmentary text, “The birth of Enlil” (MS 3312), might be an account of the succession from Enki and Ninki to Enlil. However, according to its translator, Christopher Metcalf, the deities mentioned in it are left unnamed, and it is therefore difficult to interpret what theogonic tradition it reflects.

A hymn to Enki might attribute his position as a god associated with water to a collective of Enki-Niki deities. A different composition dedicated to the same god might mentions two of them, Enul and Ninul, in a similar context. A prayer to Shamash and the “gods of the night” invokes Enki and Ninki alongside Alala and Belili, a pair of primordial deities belonging to the family tree of Anu.

A Middle Assyrian text, the so-called "Offering Bread Hemerology", prescribes offering bread to Lugaldukuga, Enki, Enmešarra and the West Wind on the 29th of Tašrītu, an autumn month. Offerings to the ancestors of Enlil are also mentioned in an administrative text from the reign of Nebuchadnezzar II and in so-called Astrolabe B. The latter source specifically refers to a funerary offering made in Tašrītu, and lists Lugaldukuga alongside the pair Enki and Ninki as its recipient. This might have been a rite connected to the akītu festival.

List of ancestors of Enlil

Related deities
Ancestors of Enlil could sometimes be mentioned alongside other, normally unrelated primordial figures. In An = Anum, Enšar and Ninšar occur among ancestors of Anu, and additionally another listed pair, Enuruulla and Ninuruulla, follows the en-nin pattern. In the so-called Gattung I, a compilation of exorcistic formulas, deities belonging to the lists of ancestors of Anu, namely the pair Enuruulla and Ninuruulla and Anshar and Kishar, occur among ancestors of Enlil instead. An Old Babylonian incantation also links a pair of ancestral deities usually connected to Anu, Dūri and Dāri, with Enlil.

Dina Katz proposes that Ereshkigal might have developed from Ninki. She assumes that the former might have split from the latter at some point between the reign of Eannatum and Uruinimgina. In contrast with Ninki, Ereshkigal does not appear in Early Dynastic god lists.

Andrew R. George has suggested that the portrayal of the ancestors of Enlil as no longer active figures dwelling in the underworld makes it possible to compare them to the so-called "Seven Conquered Enlils". This group of deities was associated with Enmešarra.

According to Alfonso Archi, Mesopotamian primordial deities such as the ancestors of Enlil might have influenced similar groups in Hurrian mythology. Two of such Hurrian deities, Minki and Amunki, might be derived from Ninki and the Emesal form of Enki, Umunki. Wilfred G. Lambert has proposed that their names developed from possible phonetic variants of the Sumerian ones not attested in textual sources. Archi additionally suggests that another of the Hurrian primordial deities, Namšara, might have been derived from Enmešarra.

Karel van der Toorn argues that the Ugaritic god Ilib can be considered a representation of a theological idea analogous to the ancestors of Enlil.

Notes

References

Bibliography

External links
The death of Gilgameš in the Electronic Text Corpus of Sumerian Literature
Enlil and Nam-zid-tara in the ETCSL

Mesopotamian deities
Mesopotamian underworld
Underworld deities
Types of deities